Zlatko Gocevski (born April 9, 1982) is a Macedonian professional basketball power forward who last played for Blokotehna.

External links
 Profile at eurobasket.com
 profile at fiba.com
 Úrvalsdeild statistics at kki.is

References

1982 births
Living people
Macedonian men's basketball players
Sportspeople from Štip
BC Yambol players
Power forwards (basketball)
Úrvalsdeild karla (basketball) players
KK MZT Skopje players
KB Peja players
Keflavík men's basketball players
KK Vardar players